Tubi is an American over-the-top content platform and ad-supported streaming service owned by Fox Corporation. The service was launched on April 1, 2014, and is based in Los Angeles, California. In January 2021, Tubi reached 33 million monthly active users. As of January 2023, Tubi has 64 million monthly active users.

History
Tubi was founded by Farhad Massoudi and Thomas Ahn Hicks of AdRise in San Francisco, launching in 2014 as a free service. In May 2017, they raised US$20 million in a round of funding from Jump Capital, Danhua Capital, Cota Capital, and Foundation Capital. In June 2019, Tubi announced that it had over 20 million active monthly users, and later in September, the company reported that users had streamed 132 million hours of content. In September 2020, the company reported 33 million monthly users.

In 2019, CEO Farhad Massoudi announced that Tubi would nearly double its 2018 spending on licensed content, close to US$100 million. In February 2019, Tubi signed a distribution deal with NBCUniversal, which includes 400 TV episodes and films.

Tubi became available on Vizio SmartCast on September 25, 2019. On October 21, Tubi launched Tubi Kids, a dedicated hub for the streamer's children-centric content via Roku and supported devices.

On March 17, 2020, Fox Corporation announced that it would acquire Tubi for $440 million, with the sale being completed on April 20; Farhad Massoudi would remain at the company, which would continue as a separate subsidiary.

In December 2021, Fox acquired MarVista Entertainment, in a move to bolster Tubi's library and leverage its production capabilities for made-for-TV movies.

In December 2022, Tubi signed a content deal with South Korean entertainment company CJ ENM.

In February 2023, Tubi purchased an ad for Super Bowl LVII that confused many viewers into believing that they had accidentally changed the channel on their televisions.

Investors and board members 
Sandy Grushow, former Fox TV chair, is an advisory board member.

Mark Amin, former vice chair of Lionsgate, is an investor.

Adrise, the company behind Tubi, has raised $4million in capital. Principal investors include Foundation Capital, Bobby Yazdani, Zod Nazem, SGH Capital, and Streamlined Ventures.

Global availability

In November 2015, Tubi and Blue Ant Media reached a deal to make Tubi available to stream in Canada.

Tubi became inaccessible throughout the European Union as a result of the GDPR entering into force on May 25, 2018. It was later announced that Tubi would relaunch in the United Kingdom by early 2019. As of July 15, 2021, Tubi has yet to relaunch in the United Kingdom. According to their website, they "hope to relaunch in the UK and EU in the future". and is "working on compliance [with GDPR] and is planning to relaunch in European countries soon".

Tubi officially launched in Australia on September 1, 2019.

In January 2020, Tubi announced an expansion to Mexico, in a partnership with TV Azteca.

In July 2022, Tubi announced a partnership with Shaw Communications to make the service available to all of Shaw's customers, and further expanding Tubi's reach in Canada.

In August 2022, Tubi launched in Costa Rica, Ecuador, El Salvador, Guatemala and Panama.

Programming
As of December 2022, Tubi's programming includes over 40,000 films and television series from over 250 providers (American and foreign). These have included The Walt Disney Company (including 20th Century Studios), A&E Networks, Metro-Goldwyn-Mayer, Gaumont Film Company, Paramount Pictures, Magnolia Pictures, Lionsgate, Skydance Media, STX Entertainment, Epic Pictures, Oscilloscope Laboratories, Sony Pictures, Constantin Film, Nordisk Film, Rat Pack Filmproduktion, Warner Bros. Discovery, Studio 100, nWave Pictures, Chicken Soup for the Soul Entertainment, Your Family Entertainment, Shout! Factory, Nelvana, WildBrain, MarVista Entertainment, 9 Story Media Group, Boat Rocker Media, Bleecker Street, FilmRise, Bridgestone Multimedia, Wow Unlimited Media, Entertainment One, Regency Enterprises, Invincible Entertainment, Safier Entertainment, CJ ENM, TriCoast Worldwide, Funimation, Crunchyroll, GKIDS, Xilam, NBCUniversal, Viz Media, and Bob Ross Inc.

Since its acquisition by Fox Corporation, Tubi also carries programming from Fox Entertainment, Fox Soul, local news from Fox-owned stations and affiliates, and Fox Weather. The service began producing its own original content in 2021, including television films and series.

Tubi uses a real-time bidding platform for advertisers that deliver video ads across various platforms.

Original programming

Upcoming original programming

Original films

Upcoming original films

Sports
Tubi currently has the rights, through Fox Sports, to show live matches from the UEFA Nations League, CONCACAF Under-17 Championship, and the World Baseball Classic.

During the 2022 FIFA World Cup, Tubi offered all matches on-demand 30 minutes after they ended. 

Tubi offers several free ad-supported streaming Sports TV channels through their Live TV service. As of March 2023, these channels include offerings from the FIFA World Cup, Fox Sports, National Football League, Major League Baseball, Women's Sports Network, Racing America, beIN ñ Sports Xtra, beIN Sports Xtra, Fubo Sports Network, Stadium, Pac-12 Insider, Sports Wire, Fox Sports en Español, ACCDN, and NHRA.

References

External links 
 

2014 establishments in California
Internet television streaming services
Advertising video on demand
American entertainment websites
2020 mergers and acquisitions
Internet properties established in 2014
Fox Corporation subsidiaries
Companies based in Los Angeles